The 1923–24 Penn Quakers men's ice hockey season was the 12th season of play for the program.

Season
Penn's season began normally, with a slew of new players trying out for the squad. Despite much more practice time entering this season than the year before, coach Powers wasn't too optimistic about the team's first game and results bore that out. a 1–4 loss to began didn't harm the team too much as it was against an amateur team and wouldn't impair their collegiate ranking. After some lineup changes, the Quakers travelled up to West Point and won their first game despite very poor ice conditions. After a match with Lafayette was canceled, the spot was filled by a team composed of Princeton alumni who resided in and around Philadelphia. The game proved to be an even match and ended in a tie., which led the Quakers into their normal intercollegiate season with a .500 record.

The first big test for the team came against Yale and the Quakers were completely outmatched. Yale had several advantages in the game, including playing their 14th game of the season, but the biggest was how the Bulldogs used the closeness of the boards to the net and shot pucks off of the back wall and had them rebound out in front of the goal. Exams caused the team's next game to be played in early February and the time off didn't appear to help the squad. The next game, a few days later, also ended in a loss but the team nearly managed to overcome an early deficit and lead to some hope for the near future. The rematch with Hamilton happened at the end of the month and, despite Warner returning from a shoulder injury, the Quakers could only earn a tie with the Continentals. On a positive note, the game did attract 2,000 spectators so even in the midst of a poor season the team could still command a good-sized crowd.

The Quakers' season ended after a 1–5 loss to Dartmouth but worse news was soon to come. Due to financial constraints, the team was discontinued after the 1924 season and wouldn't play again for four years.

Roster

Standings

Schedule and Results

|-
!colspan=12 style=";" | Regular Season

References

Penn Quakers men's ice hockey seasons
Penn
Penn
Penn
Penn